In biology, the BBCH-scale for other brassica vegetables describes the phenological development of vegetables such as brussels sprouts, cauliflower and broccoli using the BBCH-scale.

The phenological growth stages and BBCH-identification keys of other brassica vegetables are:

1 For broccoli
2 For brussels sprout
3 For cauliflower and broccoli

References
 

BBCH-scale